Batozonellus lacerticida is a species of the spider-hunting wasp of the family Pompilidae.

Description
These spider hunting wasps have a mainly black body, with yellow markings on the abdomen. Wings are orange, with a brownish band on the tips of the forewings.

Biology
This species hunts large orb weaver spiders (family Araneidae), mainly Argiope bruennichii, Argiope lobata, Araneus angulatus and Araneus ventricosus. The wasps paralyze these spiders with their poisonous stings and drag them into their underground nests. Then they lay an egg into the abdomen of their prey.

Distribution
This species can be found in most of Europe.

References

External links
 Batozonellus lacerticida - Biodiversity Heritage Library - Bibliography
 Batozonellus lacerticida - NCBI Taxonomy Database
 Batozonellus lacerticida - Global Biodiversity Information Facility
 Batozonellus lacerticida - Encyclopedia of Life

Pompilinae
Insects described in 1771
Taxa named by Peter Simon Pallas